Aniva Bay (Russian: Залив Анива (Zaliv Aniva), Japanese: 亜庭湾, Aniwa Bay, or Aniva Gulf) is located at the southern end of Sakhalin Island, Russia, north of the island of Hokkaidō, Japan. The largest city on the bay is Korsakov.

Ecology
The bay has received news coverage because the Sakhalin-II led energy consortium has been accused of significant environmental violations and dumping dredging in the bay. This received attention from environmental groups, namely Sakhalin Environment Watch, and the harm the dredging is doing to the native wildlife. Significant fish and crab kills have occurred, and salmon in the bay have been affected.

References

 

Bays of Sakhalin Oblast
Bays of the Sea of Okhotsk